Burn-Jeng Lin (born 1942) is a Taiwanese electrical engineer.

Education 
After graduating from National Taiwan University in 1963 with a degree in electrical engineering, Lin earned his doctorate in the same subject from Ohio State University in 1970.

Career 
While working for IBM, Lin became the first to propose immersion lithography, a technique that became viable in the 1980s. Lin left IBM to found his own company, Linnovation, Inc., in 1992. He began working for TSMC in 2000. Lin was named an IEEE Fellow in 2003, and granted an equivalent honor by the SPIE. The next year, SPIE gave Lin the inaugural Frits Zernike Award. In 2008, Lin was elected to membership of the United States National Academy of Engineering "for technical innovations and leadership in the development of lithography for semiconductor manufacturing." Lin received the IEEE Cledo Brunetti Award and IEEE Jun-ichi Nishizawa Medal in 2009 and 2013 respectively. In 2014, Lin was named a member of Academia Sinica. Upon his retirement from TSMC, he was offered a position on the faculty of National Tsing Hua University.

References

1942 births
Living people
Taiwanese electrical engineers
Members of the United States National Academy of Engineering
Members of Academia Sinica
Fellow Members of the IEEE
Fellows of SPIE
Ohio State University College of Engineering alumni
Academic staff of the National Tsing Hua University
IBM people
Taiwanese company founders
National Taiwan University alumni